The 2014–15 Memphis Tigers women's basketball team will represent the University of Memphis during the 2014–15 NCAA Division I women's basketball season. The season marks the second for the Tigers as members of the American Athletic Conference. The team, coached by head coach Melissa McFerrin, plays their home games at the Elma Roane Fieldhouse with one game at the FedEx Forum. They finished the season 14–17, 7–11 in AAC play to finish in seventh place. They advanced to the quarterfinals of the American Athletic women's tournament where they lost to South Florida.

Media
All Tigers home games will have a radio broadcast live on WUMR. Video streaming for all home games will be available on the Memphis Tiger Network, ESPN3, or AAC Digital. Road games will typically be streamed on the opponents website, though conference road games could also appear on ESPN3 or AAC Digital.

Roster

Schedule and results

|-
!colspan=12 style="background:#000080; color:#808080;"| Exhibition

|-
!colspan=12 style="background:#808080; color:#000080;"| Regular Season

|-
!colspan=12 style="background:#000080;"| 2015 AAC Tournament

|-

See also
 2014–15 Memphis Tigers men's basketball team

References

Memphis
Memphis Tigers women's basketball seasons